The  is a railway line operated by the Japanese private railway operator Alpico Kōtsū in the western suburbs of Matsumoto, Nagano Prefecture.

Stations
All stations on the line are located in the city of Matsumoto, Nagano.

Rolling stock
, services on the line are operated using a fleet of four two-car 3000 series stainless steel electric multiple unit (EMU) trains, which were formerly Keio 3000 series EMUs.

Former Tobu 20100 series EMUs of Tobu Railway, are scheduled to replace the 3000 series trains starting in April 2022.

With the raising of the overhead power supply voltage to 1,500 V DC in December 1986, the line's fleet was replaced by four two-car former Tokyu 5000 series EMUs. As these trains did not have air-conditioning, they were replaced between 1999 and 2000 by four two-car former Keio 3000 series EMUs.

History

The overhead line power supply voltage was increased from 600 V DC to 750 V DC in 1957, and further raised to 1,500 V DC in December 1986.

Freight services were discontinued from 1 December 1973.

In September 1983, landslides caused by Typhoon Forrest resulted in suspension of services on the line beyond Shinshimashima to Shimashima. This section was formally closed on 31 December 1984.

On 1 April 2011, following a merger with local bus operators, the operating company was renamed Alpico Kōtsū.

See also
 List of railway lines in Japan

References

 
Railway lines in Nagano Prefecture
1067 mm gauge railways in Japan
Hida Mountains
Railway lines opened in 1921